Madama is a border settlement on the northeast frontier of Niger.  Little more than an army post, the settlement serves as a frontier station controlling travel between Niger and Libya. It is also the site of a former French colonial fort, built in 1931. 
The fort is now surrounded by barbed wire and a field of landmines.

Military use today 
The army of Niger maintains a garrison of a hundred soldiers, depending on the 24th Interarmes Battalion from Dirkou.

On October 23, 2014, the French government announced plans to base helicopters and 50 French troops here, under the Operation Barkhane. The French Army built a forward operating base. The French military is about 200 to 250 soldiers on January 1, 2015.

The operational base of Madama served as a command post for a military operation zone control for the French, Niger and Chad armies from 20 to 27 December 2014.

Madama Airfield 
Aviation facilities will be added: a ramp and two parking areas for aircraft and helicopter pads.
Tactical transport aircraft can land there since December 2014. In 2017, the A400M transport aircraft made its first operational mission to Niger after landing at Madama.

References 

 Nijar: Faransa za ta kafa wata sabuwar sansanin soja a yankin arewa maso gabacin Nijar

Populated places in Niger
Military installations of France in other countries
Forts